Yamba is a town in northern New South Wales, Australia at the mouth of the Clarence River.

The town economy is strongly based on fishing and tourism, but has a diverse range of influences, due to the 'Sea Change' phenomenon and the large number of baby boomers who are starting to retire to the warmer climates.

In 2009 Yamba was voted the number 1 town in Australia by Australian Traveller Magazine.

Yamba is known to have experienced the natural phenomenon known as sea foam.

History
The Yaegl and Bundjalung people are the traditional custodians of the coastal areas around Yamba, Iluka and Maclean. The ancestors of the present day Yaegl people lived around the mouth of the Clarence River and spoke Yaygirr which was closely related to Gumbaynggirr. There is evidence the Yaygirr had permanent settlements and a developed material culture. Matthew Flinders (1799) described large bark huts with rounded passageway entrances to protect dwellers from wind and rain. Similarly Captain Perry (1839) described canoes of a superior construction. (See Eleanor H McSwan’s 'A history of Yamba and Iluka')

In 1799, Matthew Flinders landed on the present southern headland at Yamba. He’d been despatched from Sydney to find a new Eden, but from his vantage point atop a craggy promontory, now Pilot Head, he dismissed the turbulent estuary as dangerous and unworthy of further examination, and then sailed away. In the 1830s, timber harvesting commenced. In 1861, the townsite was surveyed, and by October 1862 construction of the breakwater Clarence River Heads Post Office was completed. Originally named Shoal Bay in 1885, it was renamed Yamba with a population of approx 340.

In 1908, the Yamba Surf Lifesaving Club was formed and is one of the oldest surf clubs in the world. Yamba began to develop as a tourist destination in the 1930s following the arrival of the railway line at nearby Grafton. Guesthouses were replaced by motels and holiday apartments following the sealing of the main road in 1958, with visitors now able to use bridges rather than punts and ferries.

Fishing and oyster industries were established in the 1880s, with prawn trawling pioneered in the 1940s. Sugar cane farming is now the major cropping industry in the region following full mechanisation of the cane cutting process in 1978. Riverboats and steamers that plied between Grafton and Sydney were gradually replaced by rail and better road connections from the 1970s.

Etymology 
There are two theories as to the meaning of Yamba, one being that it is the local Aboriginal word for "headland". However, J.S. Ryan, following R.L. Dawson's early Recollections and Records of the Clarence Aborigines, believes the most likely derivation is an Aboriginal word yumbah meaning a rough edible shellfish the size of a man's hand that clings to rocks and is similar to an oyster.

Port of Yamba

Since 1 December 2011, the Port of Yamba has been managed by the Sydney Ports Corporation, which on 1 July 2014 became the Port Authority of New South Wales, a corporation owned by the Government of New South Wales. The major export from the port is timber.  There are regular general cargo services from Yamba to Lord Howe Island, Norfolk Island, and New Zealand.

In addition to the Port wharf, Yamba has privately owned slipway and repair wharves.

Surrounds 
Yamba is surrounded by Yuraygir National Park, the Clarence River, Pacific Ocean and rural land. The town is within reach of Ballina, Lismore and Grafton. Yamba is only an hour and a half drive from Byron Bay, two hours from Coffs Harbour and three hours to the Gold Coast and four hours from Brisbane. It is also a two-hour flight from Sydney.

Beaches 
Yamba boasts eleven beaches within the 2464 postcode: Whiting, Turners, Yamba (Main), Convent/McKittricks, Pippi, Flat Rock (Barri Point), and Barri (known locally as Dump Beach). Nearby beaches to the north include Woody Head, Iluka Bluff, Back Beach (Iluka), and to the south Green Point, Spooky, Angourie Bay, Angourie Point, Back Beach (Angourie), Shelley, Caves, and Plumbago.

Climate 
Yamba has a humid subtropical climate (Cfa according to the Köppen climate classification system). Despite its high rainfall amount, the city gets 131.2 clear days annually.

Culture 

The town has a relaxed lifestyle with access to two pubs and two clubs, the Pacific Hotel and Yamba Shores Tavern, a golf club and a bowling club all with regular live performances. Yamba also has sporting and recreation groups such as the Yamba Buccaneers rugby union club and the Yamba Breakers football club, the Yamba community heated pool and Raymond Laurie Sports Centre, plus restaurants, a youth hostel, eateries, cafes, Internet facilities, cinema, primary schools, churches, golf course, library, post office, banks, bowling greens, and a large deep-water marina.

The Yamba Museum is operated by the Port of Yamba Historical Society and features displays telling the story of Yamba, the creation of the port, surfing, fishing and sugar industries.  There are also changing historical displays and art exhibitions in the Old Kirk attached to the museum, located in River Street.

Peak tourist seasons are December–January, Easter, mid-year and October.  Yamba is also home to the Lower Clarence and Surrounds FM Community Radio Station TLC (FM 100.3).

Attractions 
At the northern tip of Pippi beach is "Lovers Point Rock Wall". Between May - October whales can be seen passing by. Dolphins are plentiful all around Yamba and can be observed swimming, surfing and fishing quite close to shore. Other attractions include Yamba Lighthouse also known as a hotspot for prostitution, Clarence River Light, Story House museum, the ferry to Iluka on the northern banks, Yuraygir and Bundjalung National Parks and the surf beach at Angourie.
There are also a number of local restaurants and boat cruises available. Popular activities include fishing, surfing, kayaking, bike riding and camping.

Located at Ford Park on the 4th Sunday of every month, the Yamba River Markets showcases local musicians, fresh produce from local farmers, food stalls, and arts and craft tents. Once a year Yamba hosts "Surfing The Coldstream Festival", delivering an outdoor community stage with predominately root based music that is broad enough to excite the demographic spread of residents and visitors. The performers share their acts, drumming, dancing, cultural art exhibitions, food and amusement rides.

Transport 
Buses run through Yamba. The nearest airport is Grafton Airport (YGFN) and there is a private airstrip on Palmers Island, just outside Yamba.
Alternatively Yamba is serviced by Lismore Regional Airport located 92 km to the north and offering several daily flights to Sydney.

Schools 
  Yamba Pre-School
  Yamba Public School
  St James Primary School
Note: There is no high school in Yamba.  Most Yamba high school students attend Maclean High School.

Newspapers
The Daily Examiner
The Clarence Valley Review
The Independent

Notable people
 Neville William Cayley, author, artist and ornithologist
 Kay Cottee, sailor who circumnavigated the world
 Ry Cuming, musician best known as the lead singer of electro-psych outfit The Acid
 Peter Cousens AM Actor singer director. Best known for Musical Theatre. Les Miserables Phantom of the Opera and Miss Saigon
 Kane Douglas, New South Wales Waratahs Rugby Union player
 Luke Douglas, Cronulla-Sutherland Sharks and Gold Coast Titans NRL player
 Daine Laurie, Wests Tigers and Penrith Panthers NRL player
 Cameron Pilley, professional squash player
 Tony Priddle, St. George Dragons NRL player
 Donna Urquhart, professional squash player

References

External links
Clarence Valley Council Website
Clarence Valley Tourism Website

Towns in New South Wales
Port cities in New South Wales
Northern Rivers
Fishing communities in Australia
Coastal towns in New South Wales
1854 establishments in Australia
Populated places established in 1854
Clarence Valley Council